V/H/S/94 is a 2021 American found footage horror anthology film, and the fourth installment in the V/H/S franchise. The film originates from a screenplay written by David Bruckner and Brad Miska, with segments directed by franchise returnees Simon Barrett and Timo Tjahjanto, in addition to newcomers Jennifer Reeder, Ryan Prows and Chloe Okuno. The overarching plot follows a police SWAT team who stumbles upon a sinister cult compound and its collection of VHS tapes.

Following the series' cult origins around film festivals, V/H/S/94 had its world premiere at Fantastic Fest on September 26, 2021, and was also screened at Beyond Fest on October 4, 2021. The film was released as a Shudder Original Film via horror film streaming service Shudder on October 6, 2021. Later that month, Shudder announced that V/H/S/94 had become the platform's biggest movie premiere ever, with "record-setting viewership numbers" until 2022, when it was surpassed by its sequel, V/H/S/99.

Plot 
The film's segments are presented as a series of cassettes found by the SWAT team members in the frame narrative ("Holy Hell") as they advance through an abandoned warehouse containing remnants of a ritualistic cult mass suicide.

Holy Hell (Prologue/Frame Narrative)
 Written and directed by Jennifer Reeder

A woman dressed in white clothing inhales a gaseous vapour being emitted by a gelatinous, white substance on her hands. Later, the same woman, with her eyes gouged out, counts down from ten in a staticky voice as another woman passes behind her. A SWAT team — consisting of Slater, Oursler, Sprayberry, Spivey, Petro and Nash, and their cameraman Gary — raid a warehouse during what is believed to be a drug bust. They find a private jet behind the warehouse. A distorted female voice emanates from the speakers: "All are welcome. All are watching. Finally, followers, tonight is the night you've been waiting for. Track my signal. The signal is the stimulant. The signal is the sedative. The signal is salvation." As the officers charge through the tight corridors, they discover multiple prison cell-like rooms with television sets displaying static. They spot a man sitting in one of the rooms, but as the officers order him to not move, they realize he is dead, with his eyes gouged out and the viscous white substance—the drug the SWAT team is after—dripping onto the floor.

Advancing through the warehouse in search of suspects, the team enters the room seen in the VHS tape and encounter more dead cultists. Slater orders to search the upper floor with Blue team while the remaining officers keep going as one of the televisions begins to play a newscast.

Storm Drain
 Written and directed by Chloe Okuno
 "The Veggie Masher" commercial directed and edited by Steven Kostanski, produced by Astron-6 Video

In Westerville, Ohio, Channel 6 News reporter Holly Marciano and her cameraman Jeff are filming a story about the Rat Man, a cryptid of local legend who has supposedly been living in the town's storm drains. After interviewing several of the town's citizens who have reportedly witnessed the creature to gain information, the duo descend into a storm drain, where they find several homeless encampments. While filming, they are approached by a man covered in black slime. Holly tries to interview him, but when he begins to spit up black liquid and murmurs "Raatma," they attempt to flee. Before they can make their escape, they are captured by other residents of the sewers.

They are taken deeper into the sewers by the dwellers. The minister of the local church, who Holly had interviewed earlier, appears and announces that a new order will soon begin. He then summons the Rat Man, which is revealed to be a grotesque half-human/half-rat creature dubbed "Raatma" that he and the other sewer dwellers worship as a god. Raatma proceeds to vomit black liquid, which the minister pours over Jeff's face, the viscous substance killing him as it melts the flesh from his head. Holly is then brought before Raatma, the creature growling in approval as she screams.

After a brief infomercial for "The Veggie Masher" plays, the film returns to the newscast, where Holly's co-anchor explains that she was rescued from the storm drain and has returned to work at the station, though Jeff is still missing. Holly gives her next report, unwittingly substituting random words with "Raatma", confusing her co-anchor. She suddenly vomits the black liquid on his face, melting it off as he dies screaming on air. As the newsroom erupts in panic, Holly, revealed to have been successfully converted/brain-washed by the sewer cult, cheerfully finishes her report, signing off with "Hail Raatma."

Back in the framing story, the officers go deeper into the building and come across a room set up to look like a church, with a giant screen at the front and severed mannequins in the seats. The giant screen begins to play video footage from a funeral home.

The Empty Wake
Written and directed by Simon Barrett

At Jensen Funeral Home, a young woman named Hailey is assigned to host a wake for a man named Andrew Edwards. whose family has requested that the service be video recorded during the whole night. Hailey's boss Ronald and another assistant, Tim, leave the building for the night, leaving Hailey to pass the time reading. A strong thunderstorm begins outside, causing the power to flicker. Hailey then calls her friend Sharon, asking for her to check the local obituaries for Andrew's name. When she hears strange noises from the casket, which has moved on the bier, Hailey calls Tim and says that she thinks Andrew may still be alive. Tim quells her worries by explaining that the body is most likely releasing gases that are causing the noises. As the storm worsens, the building begins to occasionally lose power. A strange man who identifies himself as Gustav and claims to be a relative of Andrew arrives to the wake, during which Hailey allows him to pay his respects. After uttering an apparent incantation in Hungarian, Gustav thanks Hailey for the opportunity and abruptly leaves.

Sometime later, Sharon reveals to Hailey that Andrew had committed suicide by leaping from the roof of a church while he was shouting gibberish. The power cuts out again, plunging the building into darkness as the noises resume from the casket. At one point, the casket suddenly and noticeably jerks in her direction, terrifying her. Trying to leave, Hailey discovers the front doors are chained shut. Returning to the viewing room, she finds the casket tipped over, open, and empty. She is attacked by Andrew's reanimated corpse, but because the top of its head is missing, it cannot see her. Hiding behind the casket, she finds the top of Andrew's head. Hailey is able to temporarily distract Andrew by playing viewing room music via remote control, but Andrew's functional eyes lock onto her, allowing the rest of his corpse to find Hailey. As it attacks, the storm, which has escalated into a tornado, strikes the funeral home as the camera cuts out. After it passes, Hailey, having been possessed by Andrew's spirit, rises and crawls through the window and into the surrounding area.

Back in the framing story, the officers discover body parts strewn across the floor, mannequins in the toilet stalls, and upside-down crosses hanging from the ceiling of various rooms. Panicked, they plan to exit the building. As an unknown voice states, "Forever starts right now", a television begins to play footage from a bizarre laboratory.

The Subject
Written and directed by Timo Tjahjanto

In Indonesia, a man wakes up to find his body gone and replaced by mechanical spider legs. He falls from his restraints and catches fire, which is soon extinguished by Dr. James Suhendra, a deranged scientist who desires to create a successful mechanical-human hybrid, using kidnapped humans as guinea pigs. He carries out a lobotomy on a young woman with the initials S.A. (referred to as 'Subject 99') using a circular saw, and sedates a restrained young man (referred to as 'Subject 98') after he wakes up early. Both experiments are successful; Subject 98 becomes a large robot with spring-powered blades for arms, and S.A. becomes a functioning cyborg that responds to speech. The rest of the tape is mostly presented from her point of view. James celebrates S.A.'s success as a news report states that a rash of recent disappearances are driving wedges between the police and the public. James is suspected of kidnapping his patients, and S.A.'s old self is shown onscreen; James remarks on how she still recognizes her old appearance.

James attempts to wipe S.A.'s memories; S.A. wakes up during the procedure and hits James, before attempting to undo her restraints. James beats S.A. repeatedly with a metal tray, and her battery life drops before he is interrupted by a knock at the door; a team of heavily armored police officers have arrived to arrest James. James throws a blanket over S.A. as the officers break in as the tape cuts to the feed of Jono, the timid officer assigned with recording the raid. After the commander confirms that James is their suspect, the police shoot him dead, and begin hunting the lab for survivors. They discover S.A., and argue over whether she should be killed or kept alive as she is not classified as human anymore, despite technically being a survivor. A sudden blackout occurs in the lab, and Jono witnesses S.A. escape, but does not say anything.

Another officer attempts to shoot the door lock and free the group, but triggers an explosion. As the group come to, an alarm begins to sound and James's contingency plan begins. Over a speaker, James states that his creation is his alone, and that those who try to take it from him shall die. Subject 98 awakens and slaughters most of the soldiers; Jono and the commander survive after the commander hurls a grenade at 98. S.A. comes to and flees through the building, being shot at by the surviving officers and chased by 98. She locks herself in a small office room and finds blueprints for her cyborg body and cannon arm, along with the upper half of her head and face preserved in a jar of formaldehyde. She approaches a mirror, and sees her new form for the first time; enraged, she punches the mirror and breaks it. After leaving the room and coming across more of James's failed experiments, S.A. finds and equips the cannon arm and fights her way through the building, slaughtering any soldiers she comes across in self-defense. She discovers Jono behind a door, and spares him after he begs for his life and promises to help her out of the lab. Suddenly, the commander appears and shoots S.A. before beating her; Jono grabs a gun and shoots the commander dead before being attacked by Subject 98. With her battery critically low, S.A. uses the last of her strength to tear out 98's brain, killing it. She collapses next to a heavily injured Jono, and her battery finally dies. The tape cuts to a security camera, which shows S.A. standing up on her own accord, escaping from the lab.

Back in the framing story, it is shown that Nash and Petro have killed Gary & kidnapped Spivey. As the rest of the team frantically search for him, Nash states "Forever starts right now". In front of a wall of TV screens, Slater pages his missing teammates over his radio, and Petro states that he should try not to lose his head. Slater suddenly collapses and enters a trance in front of one of the screens, which proceeds to display footage of a snowy, fortified militia enclosure.

Terror
Written and directed by Ryan Prows

The First Patriots Movement Militia are a white supremacist extremist group that are currently plotting to blow up a local government building in a bid to "take back America". It is shown that they live in a well-secured compound in a deserted area somewhere in Detroit, Michigan. The compound has a room for security cameras, as well as a heavily protected small room covered in wooden crosses. In the latter room, a man is chained up and kept prisoner. Bob, the group's cameraman, Greg, the group leader, and Chuck, a group member, enter the room. The man pleads for his life, and Greg shoots him at point-blank range. The film cuts to one of the group's propaganda videos, where Greg explains that the group intends to purge evil from America.

Members of the group set out in a car and drive past the building which they plan to blow up, surveying the site for security cameras and possible entry points. Back at the compound, Slater from the framing segment arrives to supply guns and ammunition to the group, asking if they have tested the "creature". It is shown that the group regularly shoot the man, who is revealed to be a vampire, and siphon his blood, which becomes explosive when exposed to sunlight, planning to use said blood instead of a bomb. Wanting to test if their plan works, they inject a rabbit with some of the vampire's blood and cage it; when the sun rises, the rabbit explodes. In celebration, the group drink heavily and party. Bob enters the compound and visits Steve, who is sitting in the security camera room. The pair visit the vampire's corpse, and Bob goads Steve into kissing it; the head falls forward and showers Steve in blood as Bob laughs.

The next morning, an emergency bell rings and alerts the members of the group. Greg berates Jimmy, who was supposed to be on duty guarding the compound. Jimmy runs towards a body behind the truck, discovering it to be Terry, his neck having been badly gored. Suddenly, crashes come from inside the compound, and the group realizes they are missing Steve. Greg calls for Steve, just as a severed head is thrown out of the compound entrance as roars sound from inside. A member begins firing a truck-mounted machinegun on the compound, losing control due to the sway and killing some of the group in the process, and is shot in the head by Tom when he is unable to stop. Steve then stumbles out of the compound covered in the vampire's blood, promptly exploding once he steps into the daylight.

The remaining members of the group - Greg, Tom, Bob and Jimmy - vow to kill the vampire. They enter the compound and discover the creature hiding in the attic; it tears Tom's face off and Greg shoots wildly at it. In the attic, the vampire kills Jimmy by slamming his head on the floor repeatedly, and Bob shoots at it, missing and shooting Greg in the leg. Bob is attacked by the vampire, dying after his face is bitten off. Greg, repeating the phrase "Christ is king" is dragged by the vampire into the cage. It then opens the attic window and lets in sunlight, causing the vampire to explode and the compound to be destroyed.

Holy Hell (Epilogue)

The majority of the SWAT team are now dead, their eyes having been gouged out. Slater is tied to a chair by Petro and Nash, who rebuke him for supplying the militia in the previous video with guns. The women explain that they are members of the snuff/fetish film cult that has been operating out of the warehouse, where they create and distribute videotapes depicting animal cruelty, cannibalism and other shocking acts of violence. Slater is told that he will be their final kill for this video, whereupon Petro beats him to death with a video camera. As the film ends, Petro and Nash believe this will be their best tape yet, with the former wondering what to call it.

Cast

"Holy Hell"
Kimmy Choi as Petro
Nicolette Pearse as Nash
Thomas Mitchell as Sprayberry
Dru Viergever as Slater
Rodrigo Fernandez-Stoll as Spivey
Dax Ravina as Oursler
Kevin P. Gabel as Cameraman Gary
William Jordan as Tom Tucker

"Storm Drain"
Anna Hopkins as Holly Marciano
Christian Potenza as Cameraman Jeff
Brian Paul as Pastor
Tim Campbell as TV Anchor Mark
Gina Philips as Camille
Hume Baugh as Camo Guy
Sean Sullivan as Hippie
Thiago Dos Santos as Raatma
Kyle Durack as Storm Dweller
Demetri Kellesis as Storm Dweller
Sean Dolan as Skateboarder
Sophia Machula as Skateboarder
Anthony Perpuse as Skateboarder

"The Veggie Masher"
Conor Sweeney as Himself

"The Empty Wake"
Kyal Legend as Hayley
Devin Chin-Cheong as Andrew Edwards
Daniel Matmor as Gustav
Adam Kenneth Wilson as Ronald
David Reale as Tim

"The Subject"
Shania Sree Maharani as S.A.
Shahabi Sakri as Male Subject
Daniel Ekaputra as Male Subject Alpha
Budi Ross as The Creator
Donny Alamsyah as Capt. Hassan
Bio One as Jono
Vincent Martin as Ali
Novi Rahmat as Jaka
Sekar Dewantari as Failed Subject
Andhika Martsanda H. as Spider Subject
Andini Effendi as Announcer

"Terror"
Christian Lloyd as Greg
Thomas Mitchell Barnet as Cameraman Bob
Cameron Kneteman as Chuck
Steven McCarthy as Jimmy
Brendan McMurthey-Howlett as Prisoner
Slavic Rogozine as Steve
Daniel Williston as Wayne
Dru Viergever as Slater

Production

Development
In June 2020, it was announced that a reboot of the V/H/S franchise was in development, with a fourth installment titled V/H/S/94, written by David Bruckner. The film was said to take the franchise in a different direction, with each anthology short film converging for the first time into a unified narrative. The title refers to the year in which the film takes place, 1994. The project was a joint-venture production between Bloody Disgusting Films, Radio Silence Productions, Cinepocalypse Productions, Studio71, Raven Banner Entertainment, and Shudder Original Films.

Bruckner, who directed fan favorite segment "Amateur Night" in the original V/H/S, was set to direct the wraparound but dropped out due to commitments on the upcoming Hellraiser reboot. Likewise, filmmaking collective Radio Silence (who also directed a short in the original film, "10/31/98") was set to direct a segment, but also stepped down to focus on the upcoming Scream sequel. Unlike the previous entries in the franchise, where each segment was shot simultaneously with different crews, the filming for V/H/S/94 was largely sequential, with four out of the five shorts (save for "The Subject") having been shot in Toronto, Canada with overlapping crews. Writers David Bruckner and Simon Barrett had prepared preliminary scripts for the wraparound plot, but those stories were ultimately cut in favor of Jennifer Reeder's script.

In August 2021, it was announced that Greg Anderson of experimental drone metal band Sunn O))) would be the composer for the film score.

Filming
Principal photography was completed during the COVID-19 coronavirus pandemic. According to producer Josh Goldbloom, the production teams built sets in hotels and conference rooms, and "in the spirit of the series punk rock roots [they] even ventured underground into a sewer."

During a Comic-Con@Home discussion panel on the film, Goldbloom added that the filmmakers had gone "very era-authentic with this iteration of V/H/S", utilizing older video equipment, physical tape transfers and digital effects to make each segment look like amateur video from the 1990s. The directors also detailed some of their influences on making each short film, citing the events and video footage of the Waco siege, O.J. Simpson's Bronco chase, the Nancy Kerrigan-Tonya Harding assault and the Heaven's Gate religious group. Directors Jennifer Reeder and Timo Tjahjanto mentioned David Cronenberg's Videodrome and infamous mondo shockumentary Faces of Death as inspirations, respectively. Tjahjanto concluded that "ironically, the latest V/H/S will probably be the grungiest looking."

In an interview for The Daily Texan, Goldbloom and the filmmakers explained how some of the segments achieved the deteriorated VHS look. The filmmakers shot their segments at 29.97 frames per second to emulate the shot-on-video aesthetic. According to director Chloe Okuno, the segment "Storm Drain" — inspired by horror film [REC] and documentary Dark Days — was shot digitally and then converted to tape and played over multiple times to purposefully degrade the footage. Director Simon Barrett explained how his short was inspired by the 1967 Soviet horror film Viy and his desire to direct a film with the premise of someone having to watch over a corpse.

Marketing 

An "exclusive first look" of V/H/S/94 was uploaded to YouTube on the official Comic-Con International channel on June 27, 2021 after a roundtable interview with the producers and directors. The short clip featured a portion of the segment "Storm Drain" by Chloe Okuno.

The first official still image of the film was released via Bloody Disgusting on September 9, 2021 to promote its announced world premiere at Fantastic Fest 2021. A week later, IGN premiered an exclusive official trailer for the film, which was then shared by Shudder and Bloody Disgusting on their respective outlets. That same month, film critics and horror film influencers were sent a care package from Shudder celebrating its "61 Days of Halloween" programming. Included in the package was a promotional faux VHS cover for V/H/S/94, with a fake cassette containing Halloween-themed candy.

On October 4, 2021 Shudder released a small promotional clip from the segment "Storm Drain" in anticipation for the film's release.

Release
The film had its world premiere at Fantastic Fest on September 26, 2021. The screening was followed by a Q&A session with producer Josh Goldbloom and directors Jennifer Reeder, Chloe Okuno, Simon Barrett and Ryan Prows. On October 4, 2021, the film was screened at Beyond Fest on a double-bill with the original V/H/S. The screening was followed by a Q&A session with producers Goldbloom and Brad Miska, and directors Okuno, Barrett and Prows. The filmmakers showcased the practical monster costume used in making the "Raatma" creature from the segment "Storm Drain".

V/H/S/94 was released in North America, Australia, New Zealand, Ireland and the United Kingdom exclusively through Shudder, on October 6, 2021.

Reception 
On reviews aggregator Rotten Tomatoes, the film holds an approval rating of 91% based on 64 reviews, with an average rating of 6.80/10. The website's critics consensus reads: "V/H/S/94 gets the franchise back on track with a gory buffet of shorts that should delight horror anthology fans." On Metacritic, the film has a weighted average score of 63 out of 100 based on nine critics, indicating "generally favorable reviews".

Critics praised the film's gritty aesthetic, creature and make-up effects, and embrace of 1990s video culture. Writing for Dread Central, Drew Tinnin found that "There’s a great balance of technical artistry and funhouse fright that keep the momentum building through every story," summarizing that "V/H/S/94 hits the same high notes as the original entry and even has some new twists and turns of its own," and rating it 3.5/5.

In a positive review, Brian Tallerico of RogerEbert.com said that while the film is not impervious to the "unevenness that is common to anthology horror," it nonetheless delivers "more hits than misses, and a general air of unhinged joy for the genre that these films often lack", rating the film 2.5/4 stars.

Film critic Paul Le concluded that the film "proves the V/H/S movies are still in a class of their own when it comes to macabre, found-footage storytelling." Adam Patterson of Film Pulse stated that "The low-definition depravity of the visuals fit nicely into the underground tape-trading scene by which the film was certainly inspired". He also compared the quality of the film's segments to those of the franchise's previous entries, affirming that V/H/S/94 "is the most consistent of the bunch." Critic Nathaniel Muir praised the originality of each short film, as well as the blending of horror, science fiction and dark comedy, asserting that "V/H/S/94 is arguably the strongest entry yet" in the series.

Melissa Hannon of Horror Geek Life wrote that the wraparound story was "weak," but praised the other segments. She concluded that "V/H/S/94 delivers impressive moments of horror, insanity, and gore, with some fantastic plot twists. It is sure to satisfy fans of horror anthologies, as well as longtime fans of the V/H/S franchise," rating the film 4.1/5 stars.

Siddhant Adlakha of IGN was more critical, stating that "All five stories in V/H/S/94 feature a cult-like element, but only one of them feels like a true work of madness," rating it 6/10. The Hollywood News' Kat Hughes praised the film's look and special effects, but criticized the pacing of some segments. She thought that the film "doesn’t quite capture that same spark that the original V/H/S ignited, but does prove that there is still life in this anthology series," rating it 3/5.

Sequel 
During a roundtable interview with Dan Tabor of Cinapse News, producer Josh Goldbloom revealed that the production team "already got ideas for the next [V/H/S]" and that a potential sequel ultimately depends on the reception of V/H/S/94. On April 21, 2022, ComicBook.com reported that actor Freddy Rodriguez posted a since-deleted Instagram photo seemingly confirming his involvement in a Shudder-produced sequel. The post included the hashtag #VHS85, hinting that the film would be set in the year 1985.

On July 28, 2022, the sequel V/H/S/99 was officially announced. Set in the year 1999, it explores era-related themes such as the rise of DVD technology and Y2K hysteria. The film shows "the final punk rock analog days of VHS while taking one giant leap forward into the hellish new millennium." V/H/S/99 is the first sequel since V/H/S: Viral to include only newcomers to the franchise, with Johannes Roberts, Flying Lotus, Tyler MacIntyre, Maggie Levin, and Vanessa & Joseph Winter directing. It was released through Shudder on October 20, 2022. It opened to positive reviews from critics and fans alike.

The April 2022 leak was actually referring to another sequel, titled V/H/S/85, which was announced on October 7, 2022 with a 2023 release date.

References

External links
 

2021 films
2021 horror films
2021 science fiction horror films
2020s monster movies
American supernatural horror films
American science fiction horror films
American horror anthology films
American monster movies
American zombie films
American vampire films
Films about cults
Cyborg films
Mad scientist films
American splatter films
Splatterpunk
Films about mice and rats
Films with screenplays by David Bruckner
Films impacted by the COVID-19 pandemic
Found footage films
2020s English-language films
Indonesian-language films
Indonesian horror films
2020s American films
Shudder (streaming service) original programming
Films set in 1994
V/H/S (franchise)